The 2004 AFC U-19 Women's Championship was the second instance of the AFC U-19 Women's Championship. It was held from May 25 to June 6, 2004 in Suzhou, China PR.

Group stage

Group A

Group B

Group C

Group D

Knockout stage

Quarter-finals

Semi-finals
Winners qualify for 2004 FIFA U-19 Women's World Championship.

Third place match

Final

Winners

External links 
Results at rsssf.com
 AFC U-19 Women's Championship China 2004

Afc U-19 Women's Championship
AFC U-19 Women's Championship
Sport in Suzhou
Wom
AFc
2004
2004 in youth association football